Afronyctemera is a genus of tiger moths in the family Erebidae. The genus was erected by Vladimir Viktorovitch Dubatolov in 2006.

Species
 Afronyctemera camerunica
 Afronyctemera itokina (Aurivillius, 1904)
 Afronyctemera marcida
 Afronyctemera plana

References

Dubatolov, V. V. (2006) "On the generic status of the Afrotropical Nyctemera species (Lepidoptera, Arctiidae)". Atalanta. 37 (1/2): 191-205.

Nyctemerina
Moth genera